Stade du Bram is a stadium in Louhans, France.  It is currently used for football matches and is the home stadium of CS Louhans-Cuiseaux.  The stadium holds 8,400 spectators.

References

External links

Stadium information

Louhans-Cuiseaux FC
Bram
Sports venues in Saône-et-Loire